Cheilosia is a genus of hoverfly. Most Cheilosia are black or largely un-coloured, lacking the bright colours and patterns of many hoverfly species. It is one of the most species diverse genera of hoverflies. The biology of many species is little understood, but where known, the larvae of Cheilosia species feed in the stems of plants or in fungi.

Systematics
Species include:

References

External links
Images representing Cheilosia

Hoverfly genera
Eristalinae
Taxa named by Johann Wilhelm Meigen